The Light of Western Stars is a 1930 American pre-Code Western produced and distributed by Paramount Pictures. It had two directors, Otto Brower and Edward H. Knopf. This film is the third filming of Zane Grey's novel, The Light of Western Stars. Richard Arlen and Mary Brian starred. Previously filmed by Paramount as a silent in 1925.

The film was the first adaptation of Grey's works to be made with sound. Star Richard Arlen sang in this, his second Western film, performing "a cowboy chantie, accompanied by an harmonica and a jews-harp."

Cast
Richard Arlen as Dick Bailey
Mary Brian as Ruth Hammond
Regis Toomey as Bob Drexell
Fred Kohler as H. W. Stack
Guy Oliver as Sheriff Grip Jarvis
George Chandler as Slig Whalen
William Le Maire as Griff Meeker
Lew Meehan as Rifleman
Syd Saylor as Square Toe

References

External links
The Light of Western Stars, imdb.com

1930 films
Paramount Pictures films
Films based on American novels
Films based on Western (genre) novels
Films directed by Otto Brower
1930 Western (genre) films
American Western (genre) films
Films based on works by Zane Grey
American black-and-white films
1930s American films
1930s English-language films